Claude Jordan Epalla (born November 21, 1981 in Douala) is a Cameroonian footballer who previously played for Persikota Tangerang in the Liga Indonesia Premier Division from 2006 to 2009 and Persela Lamongan in the Indonesia Super League.

References

External links

1981 births
Association football forwards
Cameroonian expatriate footballers
Cameroonian expatriate sportspeople in Indonesia
Cameroonian footballers
Expatriate footballers in Indonesia
Liga 1 (Indonesia) players
Indonesian Premier Division players
Living people
Footballers from Douala
Persela Lamongan players
Persikota Tangerang players
Persita Tangerang players